The China International Culture Exchange Center (CICEC) is a front organization of the 12th Bureau of the Ministry of State Security (MSS), the principal civilian intelligence agency of the People's Republic of China. CICEC was founded in 1984 and is active in operations to influence foreign think tanks, academics, and other high-profile foreigners. In addition to the China Institutes of Contemporary International Relations, CICEC is considered one of the main front organizations utilized for foreign influence operations by the MSS.

China scholar Miwa Hirono stated that the idea for the CICEC began when then-paramount leader Deng Xiaoping wanted to advance Chinese Communist Party (CCP)'s interests through more so-called "people's diplomacy" in addition to official diplomatic channels. According to Australian analyst Alex Joske, "[f]rom its very earliest days, CICEC's activities exemplified the Leninist united front strategy of forming alliances of convenience with outside groups, only to discard or marginalise them when they are no longer needed." CICEC was a key platform for propagating the narrative of "China's peaceful rise" with foreign elites throughout the 1990s and early 2000s.

CICEC has been a long-time working partner with the China Association for Science and Technology for its technology transfer programs.

See also 

 Chinese intelligence activity abroad
 Chinese information operations and information warfare

References

External links 

 

Ministry of State Security (China)
Foreign policy and strategy think tanks in China
Chinese propaganda organisations
1984 establishments in China
Technology transfer
United front (China)